Sir William Hales Hingston  (29 June 1829 – 19 February 1907) was a Canadian physician, politician, banker, and Senator.

Biography 

Born in Hinchinbrooke near Huntingdon, Quebec, he received his MDCM from McGill University in 1851.

In 1875, he became Mayor of Montreal and was re-elected by acclamation for a second and final term.

He was president of the Montreal City and District Savings Bank (today the Laurentian Bank of Canada).

In 1896, he was appointed to the Senate of Canada representing the senatorial division of Rougemont, Quebec. He sat as a Conservative and died in office.

He was knighted by Queen Victoria in 1895. Pius IX made him a Knight Commander of the Order of St. Gregory the Great in 1875.

Family

He married Margaret Josephine Macdonald, the daughter of Donald Alexander Macdonald, and Catherine Fraser, at Toronto, Ontario 16 September 1875, Margaret was born at Alexandria, Ont., and educated in Montreal. Lady Hingston volunteered for the St. Patrick's Orphan Asylum and the Catholic Sailors' Club. She served as a director of the Women's Historical Society, and vice-president of the Aberdeen Association, Montreal. She was a founder and later President, of the Society of Decorative Art. She championed the preservation of Mount Royal Park, and served as a member of the advisory board of the Parks and Play-grounds Association. She was identified with the movement for the prevention of tuberculosis.

Their oldest son, William F. Hingston (1877–1964), was rector of Loyola College from 1918 to 1925.

Gallery

References

 
 
 
 

1829 births
1907 deaths
Canadian Knights Bachelor
Physicians from Quebec
Canadian senators from Quebec
Conservative Party of Canada (1867–1942) senators
Canadian Knights Commander of the Order of the Bath
Mayors of Montreal
Anglophone Quebec people
McGill University alumni
Burials at Notre Dame des Neiges Cemetery